Nida Eliz Üstündağ (born October 21, 1996) is a Turkish swimmer specialized in butterfly stroke. She is a member of Galatasaray Swimming.

She was born in Çanakkale on October 21, 1996. After graduation from Ankara Atatürk  High School, she entered Başkent University to study Psychology.

Üstündağ competed for Ankara University before she transferred to Galatasaray Swimming.

In 2014, Üstündağ competed in the girls' 50 m butterfly, 100 m butterfly and 200 m butterfly events at the Summer Youth Olympics in Nanjing, China. She took part at the 2016 European Aquatics Championships in London, United Kingdom and placed 44th in the women's 50 m butterfly event.

She earned a quota spot to compete for Turkey in the women's 200 m butterfly event at the 2016 Summer Olympics.

References

Living people
1996 births
Sportspeople from Çanakkale
Female butterfly swimmers
Turkish female swimmers
Galatasaray Swimming swimmers
Swimmers at the 2014 Summer Youth Olympics
Swimmers at the 2016 Summer Olympics
Olympic swimmers of Turkey
Universiade medalists in swimming
Swimmers at the 2018 Mediterranean Games
Universiade bronze medalists for Turkey
Medalists at the 2017 Summer Universiade
Mediterranean Games competitors for Turkey
21st-century Turkish women